"The Miracle" is the fifth and final single from Queen's 1989 studio album of the same name. It was composed by the entire band, though Freddie Mercury and John Deacon were the main writers. It was released as a single on 27 November 1989 and it was the band's final single release of the 1980s.

Composition
The idea for the song came from Freddie Mercury and John Deacon, who wrote the basic chord structure for the song. All four contributed to the lyrics and musical ideas, and the song was still credited to the entire band because they had agreed to do so during the album recording, regardless of who had been the actual writer. While both Mercury and May regarded this as one of their favourites, Taylor said in the audio commentary of Greatest Video Hits II that although it was not a favourite of his, he respected it as "an incredibly complex track".

The song describes several of "God's creations, great and small", such as great buildings like the Golden Gate Bridge, the Taj Mahal and the Tower of Babel, all described as "miracles" in the song, yet the one miracle "we're all waiting for" is "peace on Earth and an end to war." The song also references well-known figures such as Captain Cook, Cain and Abel, and Jimi Hendrix.

Release
The sleeve artwork for the single uses the album's artwork inverted with a hologram-like fashion. The B-sides of the single are live versions of the songs "Stone Cold Crazy" and "My Melancholy Blues" originally from the albums Sheer Heart Attack and News Of The World respectively. Specifically, Stone Cold Crazy comes from one of the two Rainbow shows that took place in November 1974, and My Melancholy Blues comes from the Houston show that took place in December of 1977.

Music video
The music video for the song features four young boys performing as Queen on stage: Paul Howard as Brian May, James Currie as John Deacon, Adam Gladdish as Roger Taylor, and a then-unknown Ross McCall as Freddie Mercury. Throughout the video, McCall appears as four different incarnations of Mercury: 1977 Freddie (long hair with a one-piece black and white Harley Quinn spandex leotard), 1978-1979 Freddie (leather pants and leather jacket, and although he is portrayed with a moustache in the video, Freddie never wore his full black leather outfit with his moustache), Live Aid 1985 Freddie (white tank top, Adidas shoes, jeans), and 1986 Freddie (Iconic yellow jacket with track pants). Queen themselves appear only near the end of the video. It was filmed in London, at Elstree Studios in November 1989. According to Roger Taylor, Mercury joked about sending the boys out on tour instead of them because of how well they did in the video. According to a story in a 2011 issue of rock magazine, NME Paul Howard, who played the part of Brian May, is currently facilities manager at LegoLand in Windsor, UK.

Track listings
7-inch single
A. "The Miracle" – 5:02
B. "Stone Cold Crazy" (live at the Rainbow Theatre, November 1974) – 2:15

12-inch and CD single
 "The Miracle" – 5:02
 "Stone Cold Crazy" (live at the Rainbow Theatre, November 1974) – 2:15
 "My Melancholy Blues" (live in Houston, December 1977) – 3:43

Personnel
 Freddie Mercury – lead vocals and backing vocals, piano, synthesizers
 Brian May – electric guitar, backing vocals
 Roger Taylor – drums, backing vocals
 John Deacon – bass

Charts

References

External links
 Lyrics at Queen official website (from The Singles Collection Volume 4)

Queen (band) songs
1989 singles
Parlophone singles
Protest songs
Rock ballads
Songs written by Freddie Mercury
1989 songs
Songs written by John Deacon
Capitol Records singles
Hollywood Records singles